Caroline Baird MBE (née Innes, born 14 March 1974) is a former athlete who represented Great Britain at three Paralympic Games. During her career she was recognised as the greatest sprinter in her class, winning four Paralympic gold medals along with two World Championships titles.

Personal life
Baird was born in Cupar, Fife on 14 March 1974 and graduated from Dundee University. She has cerebral palsy and, after a highly successful career in athletics, retired from international sport to spend time with husband John and raise a family. The couple had two daughters, Christy and Connie. Baird was awarded an MBE in the New Years Honours in 2000/2001.

Sporting career
Baird was a member of the Cupar and District Swimming Club and represented Scotland at the British Swimming Championships. She was encouraged to take up athletics and travelled to the 1989 World Games in Miami as a member of the Scottish Youth Team. Her potential was quickly recognised. The following year she won silver in both the 100m and 200m races at the World Championships in Assen.

Competing under her maiden name of Innes she attended her first Paralympic Games in 1992. and won gold in the 100m. She then competed in the World Championships in Berlin in 1994, winning bronze in both the 100m and 200m.

At the 1996 Games in Atlanta Baird retained her 100m gold. She achieved her greatest World Championship successes in Birmingham in 1998, winning gold in the 200m and 400m events.

Her greatest Paralympic results came two years later at the Games in Sydney. She won silver in the 100m and triumphed in the longer sprint distances, achieving gold medals in both the 200m and 400m events. Baird's time of 1 minute 16.65 seconds was a new world record, beating the previous time by nearly six seconds.

Baird is recognised as having been one of the leading sprinters in her class and was awarded the Young Disabled Sportswoman of the Year award in 1993. Though she is retired from international competition she still trains with coach John Oulton.

References

1974 births
Living people
Paralympic athletes of Great Britain
Paralympic gold medalists for Great Britain
Paralympic silver medalists for Great Britain
Athletes (track and field) at the 1992 Summer Paralympics
Athletes (track and field) at the 1996 Summer Paralympics
Athletes (track and field) at the 2000 Summer Paralympics
Track and field athletes with cerebral palsy
Alumni of the University of Dundee
People from Cupar
Medalists at the 1992 Summer Paralympics
Medalists at the 1996 Summer Paralympics
Medalists at the 2000 Summer Paralympics
British female sprinters
Scottish female sprinters
Scottish Paralympic competitors
Members of the Order of the British Empire
Paralympic medalists in athletics (track and field)